The Second Division Knock-Out is a football competition that takes place in Gozo. It is organized by Gozo Football Association.

The cup holders are Żebbuġ Rovers which won the cup after beating after extra time Qala Saints in the final held on April 18, 2022. This competition is played on a knock-out basis between the clubs of the Second Division. The first Second Division Knock-Out took place in the season 1958–1959.

Format 
Four unseeded team from the Second Division makes it to the preliminary round. The two winners of the respective ties join the two seeded team and participate in the semi-finals.

Cup winners 
Here is a complete list of the past champions of the Second Division Knock-Out

2021–2022 Żebbuġ Rovers
2015–2016 Għarb Rangers 
2007–2008 SK Victoria Wanderers 
2006–2007 Victoria Hotspurs 
2005–2006 Qala St. Joseph 
2004–2005 Qala St. Joseph 
2003–2004 Xagħra United 
2002–2003 SK Victoria Wanderers
2001–2002 SK Victoria Wanderers 
2000–2001 Xagħra United 
1999–2000 Għarb Rangers 
1998–1999 Kercem Ajax
1997–1998 Żebbuġ Rovers
1996–1997 Kercem Ajax 
1995–1996 Kercem Ajax 
1994–1995 Oratory Youths  
1993–1994 Xewkija Tigers
1992–1993 St. Lawrence Spurs 
1991–1992 Oratory Youths 
1990–1991 Munxar Falcons 
1989–1990 Nadur Youngsters 
1988–1989 was not held   
1987–1988 Xewkija Tigers
1986–1987 was not held 
1985–1986 was not held 
1984–1985 was not held  
1983–1984 was not held   
1982–1983 was not held 
1981–1982 was not held
1980–1981 was not held
1979–1980 Xewkija Tigers 
1978–1979 was not held   
1977–1978 SK Victoria Wanderers
1976–1977 was not held   
1975–1976 was not held   
1974–1975 was not held 
1973–1974 was not held   
1972–1973 Sannat Lions 
1971–1972 Xagħra United 
1970–1971 Sannat Lions 
1969–1970 Sannat Lions 
1968–1969 was not held   
1967–1968 was not held   
1966–1967 was not held 
1965–1966 was not held   
1964–1965 was not held   
1963–1964 was not held   
1962–1963 was not held 
1961–1962 Xagħra United 
1960–1961 was not held 
1958–1959 Victoria Hotspurs

References

External links 
 Gozo FA

Football competitions in Gozo
Football cup competitions in Malta